Augustus (2 October 1582 – 14 August 1632) was Count Palatine of Sulzbach from 1614 until 1632.

Life
Augustus was born in Neuburg in 1582 as the second son of Philip Louis of Palatinate-Neuburg and Anna of Cleves. After his father's death in 1614 his territories were partitioned between Augustus and his two brothers - Augustus received northern portions of the Duchy of Neuburg which were constituted as the Duchy of Sulzbach.

Augustus died in Windsheim in 1632 and was buried in Lauingen.

Marriage
Augustus married Hedwig of Schleswig-Holstein-Gottorp (23 December 1603 – 22 March 1657), daughter of Duke John Adolph and Princess Augusta of Denmark, on 17 July 1620 and had the following children:
Anne Sophie (17 July 1621 – 25 May 1675)
Christian Augustus (26 July 1622 – 23 April 1708)
Adolph Frederick (31 August 1623 – 14 March 1624)
Augusta Sophie (22 November 1624 – 30 April 1682), married Václav Eusebius František, Prince of Lobkowicz
John Louis (22 December 1625 – 30 October 1649)
Philip Florinus (20 January 1630 – 4 April 1703)
Dorothea Susanne (17 August 1631 – 3 July 1632)

Ancestors 

1582 births
1632 deaths
House of Wittelsbach
Counts Palatine of Sulzbach
People from Neuburg an der Donau